The San Francisco Dungeon was a tourist attraction that recreated historical events using 360° sets, special effects, and live actors. Visitors walked through the Dungeon, and were guided through each show by professional actors. The attraction also contained a dark boat ride.

The San Francisco Dungeon was opened in June 2014, following the success of its European counterparts which include the London Dungeon and the Amsterdam Dungeon. The Dungeons are owned and operated by Merlin Entertainments.
According to its website, beginning in November 2021, it was permanently closed, however Madame Tussaud's Wax Museum remains open.

Shows & Rides
Shows and rides include:
 The Descent- visitors descend into the Dungeon in an old mine shaft elevator and meet businessman Colonel Jack Gamble 
 Gold Rush Greed- a re-enactment of the clash between the natives and the new settlers on the American frontier in 1848 
 Lost Mines of Sutter's Mill- visitors search the maze of mines for any remaining gold 
 Streets of San Francisco- visitors meet gang The Hounds and their leader Sam Roberts down Kearny Street 
 The Court of San Francisco- a re-enactment of an old San Francisco courtroom where visitors are interrogated by former mayor and judge "Mad Meade"
 Miss Piggott's Saloon- recreation of an old drinking saloon featuring Miss Piggott and Shanghai Kelly
 Shanghai Kelly's Boat Ride- boat ride through the back waterways to learn about the lives of those who were sold to work as sailors
 Chinatown Plague- recreation of the streets of San Francisco during the bubonic plague epidemic in 1900.
 The Ghosts of Alcatraz- recreation of the Alcatraz military prison during the 1800s

References

Tourist attractions in San Francisco
Defunct amusement parks in California
Merlin Entertainments Group